Alfred Nijhuis (born 23 March 1966) is a Dutch former professional footballer who played as defender.

Career statistics

References

External links
 
 

1966 births
Living people
Footballers from Utrecht (city)
Association football defenders
Dutch footballers
FC Twente players
ASC Schöppingen players
MSV Duisburg players
Urawa Red Diamonds players
Expatriate footballers in Japan
Dutch expatriate sportspeople in Japan
J1 League players
Borussia Dortmund players
Bundesliga players
2. Bundesliga players
Expatriate footballers in Germany
Dutch expatriate footballers
SuS Stadtlohn managers
Heracles Almelo non-playing staff